Kyle Miller (born 8 August 1992) is a Scottish footballer who plays for Cowdenbeath, as a midfielder.

Career statistics

References

1992 births
Living people
Scottish footballers
Cowdenbeath F.C. players
Scottish Football League players
Scottish Professional Football League players
Association football midfielders